Thambikku Indha Ooru is a 2010 Indian Tamil-language masala film directed by Badri. It stars Bharath, Sana Khan, Prabhu, Vivek, Madalsa Sharma, and Ranjith. The music was composed by Dharan Kumar with cinematography by Saalai Sahadevan and editing by S. Surajkavee. The film was released on 5 March 2010 to negative reviews and was declared a box office bomb.

Plot 

Akilan is a rich youth who runs a restaurant along with his buddy Cola Kumar in Singapore. As it happens, his father Rajsekhar is surprised when Akil refuses to marry Priya. Akil goes against his father's wish as he is desperate behind Divya. Annoyed at Akil's denial, Priya's father spells out the truth that Akil was an orphan. Shocked at the developments, Akil decides to embark on a journey and find out his biological parents, whom he learns stay in Chengalpet. On his trip to homeland, he starts to encounter problems in the form of Divya's father, who is against their affair. He feels that her daughter as a popular sportswoman could earn more through endorsing various brands. Enters Kumaraswamy, who plays a crucial part in the whole story. Kumaraswamy has a long-held grudge against Rajsekhar as he feels Rajasekar was responsible for his wife's death and decides to use Akil to lure his father back to India. The film reaches its climax when Akil finds out from Thangamani that he is not his father but Kumaraswamy is. Akil is adamant not to tell Kumaraswamy until his adoptive father Rajashekar is proven innocent. In the ending scenes, Thirumalai admits his wrongdoings unconsciously on the phone to Kumaraswamy, in which way he finds out that Akil is Kumaraswamy's son. After an ensuing fight, all ends well.

Cast 

 Bharath as Akilan (Akil)
 Sana Khan as Divya
 Prabhu as Kumaraswamy
 Madalasa Sharma as Priya
 Vivek as 'Cola' Kumar
 Ranjith as Thirumalai
 Thalaivasal Vijay as Thangamani
 Saranya Ponvannan as Kumaraswamy's wife
 Nizhalgal Ravi as Rajasekhar
 Yuvarani as Mrs. Rajasekhar
 Raviprakash as Priya's father
 O. A. K. Sundar as Naana
 M. S. Bhaskar as Don in Hyderabad
 R. S. Shivaji as Kannayiram
 Lollu Sabha Manohar as prisoner
 Gowthami Vembunathan as Kamsaadai
 Cell Murugan as a Telugu priest

Soundtrack 
The soundtrack was scored by Dharan and features six songs. The lyrics were penned by Kapilan and Raajkumar. It was released on 19 January 2010 by Think Music. The soundtrack has received mixed critical reception and was only a moderate success.

Critical reception 

Sify wrote "Director Badri along with Bharath has dished out Thambikku Indha Ooru another pot-boiler using all the cliches and gimmicks associated with mass movie targeting the B & C audiences.
The film has no story, logic, reason or continuity with scenes cyclostyled from earlier films". Rediff wrote "Insane plot twists, ridiculous situations and completely illogical sequences follow, leading to an end that can't come sooner". Behindwoods wrote "It indeed requires expertise to deliver entertaining and engaging masala flicks but due to the inept screenplay, TIO loses fizz and falls flat". The Hindu wrote "When an actor is bent on establishing himself as a super hero and the director is willing to pander to his whims, the result is bound to be on the lines of ‘Thambikku Indha Ooru’ (U). The Bharath-Badri combo travels on the beaten track of a boy-meets-girl romance and predictable villainy. [..] The saving graces of ‘Thambikku …’ are just a few – Prabhu's performance, Ranjith's ease as a villain and Bharath's footwork in that order".

References

External links 
 

2010 films
2010s Tamil-language films
Films scored by Dharan Kumar
Films directed by Badri
2010 masala films